Thiago Santos Santana (born 4 February 1993), known as Thiago Santana, is a Brazilian professional footballer who plays as a striker for J2-League side Shimizu S-Pulse

Club career

São Carlos
Born in Serrinha, Bahia, Thiago Santana began his career with São Carlos, making his senior debuts in 2011 Campeonato Paulista Série A3. In 2012, he moved to Internacional, returning to youth football.

On 13 February 2014 Thiago Santana joined Caxias. On 15 January of the following year he signed for Atlético Ibirama.

Thiago Santana was the club's top scorer in the year's Campeonato Catarinense (the second best overall), with ten goals. On 8 May 2015 he joined Série A club Figueirense.

Thiago Santana made his debut in the main category of Brazilian football on 7 June 2015, starting and scoring the winner in a 2–1 home success over Palmeiras. The following January he was loaned to Náutico of the Campeonato Pernambucano, and was released in June before the Série B season due to a poor scoring rate.

Vitória Setúbal
On 11 June 2016, Thiago Santana moved abroad for the first time when he signed for Vitória de Setúbal in Portugal's Primeira Liga. In 23 total games, he scored once to open a 2–0 win at Benfica Castelo Branco in the fourth round of the Taça de Portugal on 20 November.

Santa Clara
In June 2017, Thiago Santana moved to Santa Clara of the LigaPro. He scored 15 times in 33 games in his first season in the Azores as they won promotion as runners-up to Nacional; this put him behind only Ricardo Gomes and compatriot Carlos Vinícius in the overall top scorers. He scored his first goal in Portugal's top flight on 19 August 2018, starting a comeback from 0–3 down at half time to draw at home to Braga.

On 1 April 2019, Thiago Santana signed a new three-year deal with Santa Clara. He scored six times in the upcoming season as they retained their place in the league, including two on 5 June 2020 in a 3–2 home win over Braga, played in Oeiras near Lisbon due to COVID-19 complications.

Thiago Santana scored in a 2–1 home loss to Sporting CP on 24 October 2020. He therefore surpassed Zé Manuel's record of 12 top-flight goals for Santa Clara.

Shimizu S-Pulse 
On 13 December 2020, Thiago Santana moved to Shimizu S-Pulse of the Japanese J1 League, for a fee of €1 million.

Honours
Individual
J.League Top Scorer: 2022
J.League Best XI: 2022

References

External links

1993 births
Living people
Sportspeople from Bahia
Brazilian footballers
Brazilian expatriate footballers
Association football forwards
Campeonato Brasileiro Série A players
Campeonato Brasileiro Série C players
Primeira Liga players
Liga Portugal 2 players
Sociedade Esportiva e Recreativa Caxias do Sul players
Clube Atlético Hermann Aichinger players
Figueirense FC players
Clube Náutico Capibaribe players
Vitória F.C. players
C.D. Santa Clara players
Shimizu S-Pulse players
Expatriate footballers in Portugal
Expatriate footballers in Japan
Brazilian expatriate sportspeople in Portugal
Brazilian expatriate sportspeople in Japan